Ylli Bufi (born 25 May 1948, Tirana) is an Albanian politician who served briefly as the 26th Prime Minister of Albania in 1991.

Career
Bufi is a chemical engineer. He was a member of the Albanian Parliament, and also a member of Socialist Party of Albania. He served as the minister of food led by the then prime minister Fatos Nano. In June 1991, he was appointed prime minister, replacing Nano, and Bufi's cabinet was approved by the parliament on 13 June.

References

1948 births
Living people

Albanian engineers
Food ministers of Albania
Prime Ministers of Albania
Socialist Party of Albania politicians
Politicians from Tirana